Parliamentary elections were held in Brazil on 15 November 1986. The Brazilian Democratic Movement Party won 260 of the 487 seats in the Chamber of Deputies and 38 of the 49 seats in the Senate. The members of both chambers elected in this election, together with the Senators elected in 1982 came together to form a Constitutional Assembly during 1987 and 1988. The Assembly produced a new constitution, which was promulgated on 5 October 1988.

Results

Chamber of Deputies

Senate

References

General elections in Brazil
Brazil
Legislative
November 1986 events in South America
Election and referendum articles with incomplete results